Port Vue is a borough in Allegheny County, Pennsylvania, United States. The population was 3,680 at the 2020 census.

Geography

Port Vue is located in western Pennsylvania along the Youghiogheny River near its confluence with the more navigable Monongahela River. It is bounded by McKeesport to the north, Liberty to the east and south and Glassport to the west.

Education
Port Vue is served by the South Allegheny School District.

Police 
The Port Vue Police Department is based at 1194 Romine Avenue. The Police department is under the leadership of Mayor Brien A. Hranics, Chief David Petruski and Sergeant Kevin Atkins. There are currently 4 full-time and 3 part-time officers serving the Borough.

History
Origin of Borough: In 1891, approximately 500 residents of Lincoln Township decided to create a new borough. They met in a school house on the old Edmundson farm, and initially thought of naming the new borough "Grandview." However, because of the beautiful view of the port that McKeesport maintained on the Youghiogheny River, they agreed on Port Vue instead. Since then, war veterans and coal miners commonly lived in Port Vue.   Port Vue Borough was incorporated 9/20/1892.

Government and politics

Demographics

As of the census of 2010, there were 3,798 people, 1,694 households, and 1,045 families residing in the borough. The population density was 3,645.4 people per square mile (1,484.0/km²). There were 1,832 housing units at an average density of 1,764.6 per square mile (680.9/km²). The racial makeup of the borough was 97.8% White, 2.00% African American, 0.06% Native American, 0.03% Asian, 0.01% Pacific Islander, 0.02% from other races, and 0.01% from two or more races. Hispanic or Latino of any race were 0.76% of the population.

There were 1,694 households, out of which 22.7% had children under the age of 18 living with them, 41.6% were married couples living together, 15.5% had a female householder with no husband present, and 38.3% were non-families. 32.8% of all households were made up of individuals, and 17.9% had someone living alone who was 65 years of age or older. The average household size was 2.30 and the average family size was 2.87.

In the borough the population was spread out, with 20.9% under the age of 18, 7.0% from 18 to 24, 25.7% from 25 to 44, 22.4% from 45 to 64, and 34.2% who were 65 years of age or older. The median age was 45.6 years. For every 100 females there were 89.2 males. For every 100 females age 18 and over, there were 90.0 males.

As of the 2000 census, the median income for a household in the borough was $31,509, and the median income for a family was $37,318. Males had a median income of $31,680 versus $23,203 for females. The per capita income for the borough was $16,065. About 7.7% of families and 10.5% of the population were below the poverty line, including 22.2% of those under age 18 and 5.1% of those age 65 or over.

References

Populated places established in 1892
Boroughs in Allegheny County, Pennsylvania